Michel Gaudin may refer to:

 Martin-Michel-Charles Gaudin (1756–1841), French statesman
 Michel Gaudin (physicist) (born 1931), French physicist